The women's 10,000 metres event at the 1986 Commonwealth Games was held on 28 July at the Meadowbank Stadium in Edinburgh. It was the first time that this event was contested at the Commonwealth Games.

Results

References

Athletics at the 1986 Commonwealth Games
1986